Mount Saga is a peak rising to ,  southwest of Hetha Peak in the Asgard Range of Victoria Land. The summit surmounts a ridge at the southern extremity of the head of Hart Glacier. In association with the theme of names in Asgard Range, named by the New Zealand Geographic Board in 1994 after a goddess in Norse mythology whose name means seeress.

References

Saga